Harold Turner may refer to:
Hal Turner (born 1962), United States politician
Harold L. Turner (1898–1938), Medal of Honor recipient
Harold Turner (dancer) (1909–1962), British ballet dancer
Harold Turner (footballer) (1911–1984), Australian rules footballer

See also
Harald Turner (1891–1947), World War II German official in the German-imposed Military Administration of Serbia
Harry Turner (disambiguation)